Erika Berger (August 13, 1939 – May 15, 2016) was a German television presenter and author.

Life 
Berger worked as a television presenter on German television broadcaster RTL. As a writer she wrote several books on sexuality. Berger had two children.

Works by Berger 
 Der Bett-Knigge: vom Umgang mit dem geliebten anderen Geschlecht, Heyne, Munich 1986, .
 Was Sie schon immer über Liebe wissen wollten: Ein Handbuch für die glückliche Partnerschaft Heyne, Munich 1987, .
 Die neue Zärtlichkeit: Liebe ohne Angst Heyne, Munich 1988, .
 Eine Chance für die Liebe: das Buch zur Fernsehsendung, Goldmann, Munich 1989, .
 Körpersprache der Erotik, Heyne, Munich 1993, .
 Power mit 50: der Weg zu einem neuen Lebensgefühl, Lübbe, Bergisch Gladbach 1994.
 Lust statt Frust: meine Wohlfühlformeln mvgVerlag, 2007.
 Spätes Glück: Liebe, Sex und Leidenschaft in reifen Jahren mvgVerlag, 2008, .
 Langenscheidt, Sex-Deutsch, Deutsch-Sex Langenscheidt, 2009, .

References

External links 
 Spiegel.de: Interview: "Worüber soll man denn sonst reden ? (German)
 Welt.de: Es wird immer mehr nackert

German television presenters
German women television presenters
Writers from Munich
1939 births
2016 deaths
Television people from Munich
RTL Group people